Ryhan Euan Griffin Stewart (born 15 February 2000) is a Singaporean professional footballer who plays as a defender for Thai League 2 club Chiangmai and the Singapore national team. He is the older brother of Harhys Stewart, who’s also a professional footballer for Young Lions FC.

Early career
Stewart played for Tampines Prime League team in 2017. In 2018 he was signed to the senior team in the Singapore Premier League.

Club career

Tampines Rovers
After a successful season under Tampines Rovers development team, he was called up by then coach Jürgen Raab and signed his first professional in 2018.

Warriors
After one season with Tampines Rovers first team in 2018 without making any competitive appearances, Stewart was signed by Warriors FC for the upcoming 2019 Singapore Premier League season. He made his unofficial debut in the club's pre-season tour in Malaysia, playing several local clubs in the Malaysia Super league and Malaysia Premier League. Stewart then made his competitive debut in club football in the inaugural game of Warriors 2019 season. He played the full match at right-back as Warriors fell 5-1 to Hougang United.

He eventually played a crucial part in Warriors eventual cup run to final of the Komoco Singapore cup Final.

Young Lions
After Warriors were ordered by the FAS to sit out the 2020 Singapore Premier League season, due to financial issues, Stewart then signed for the Young Lions in 2020. He was named in Goal Singapore's 2020 NxGn list alongside players such as Ilhan Fandi and Farhan Zulkifli. He eventually enlisted in the Police Force for his National Service commitments restricting his appearances in the COVID hit 2020 Singapore Premier League season. On 21 November, he scored his first professional goal in a 2-1 away win against Balestier Khalsa.

Chiangmai
Ryhan was signed by Chiangmai ahead of the 2022-23 Thai League 2 season.

International career 
Stewart was first called up to the Singapore under-22 in 2019 for the 2019 Merlion Cup.  He made his debut and his first start for the under-22s on 7 June 2019, against Philippines.

He was then called up for the 2019 SEA Games in Manila, where Singapore U22 are to face Laos, Indonesia, Thailand, Vietnam and Brunei.

Stewart received his first senior national team call-up in a training session in March 2021. Stewart officially made his international debut on 14 June 2022 against Myanmar, replacing Christopher van Huizen in the 88th minute.

Personal life
Stewart was born in Singapore to a Welsh father and a Singaporean Malay mother.  His younger brother, Harhys Stewart, is also a footballer playing for Young Lions. He moved to the UAE at a young age, before then relocating to Finland and eventually returning to his native country.

Career statistics

Club

International

International caps

U23 International caps

Honours
Singapore U22
 Merlion Cup: 2019

References

2000 births
Living people
Singaporean footballers
Singapore youth international footballers
Singaporean people of Welsh descent
Singaporean people of Malay descent
Association football defenders
Singapore Premier League players
Ryhan Stewart
Tampines Rovers FC players
Warriors FC players
Ryhan Stewart
Competitors at the 2019 Southeast Asian Games
Competitors at the 2021 Southeast Asian Games
Southeast Asian Games competitors for Singapore